Ashutosh Phatak is a composer, producer, multi-instrumentalist and entrepreneur based in Mumbai. He is one of the founding partners of live music chain blueFROG, co-founder of The True School of Music, and one of the co-founders of The Quarter.

Phatak has composed music for over 3000 television commercials, soundtracks for over 10 feature films, and released over 15 contemporary music albums.

Biography

Early life and career beginnings 
Phatak, who did his schooling at the Cathedral &amp; John Connon School, formed an informal band with his school friends, where he handled singing responsibilities. After earning a degree in Economics with a minor in Western Classical Music Theory from the University of Pennsylvania, he returned to Mumbai and did a short stint in his family business.

Simultaneously, Phatak composed music for TV serials and commercials, and re-congregated his previous band to form Orphean Revival (1993–95).

In 1995, Phatak was responsible for one of the first original score to be created for an Indian fashion show. He composed a score for designers Abu Jani and Sandeep Khosla, and this was again performed at the Femina Miss India contest later in the year.

Phatak was born into the aristocratic Chitpavan brahmin Phatak gharana of Jambhali, making him a distant relation of gynaecologist Y. V. Phatak. He is a descendant of Ramchandra Phatak, brother to Chimnaji Phatak and uncle to Balkrishna Phatak.

Career
Composer

Phatak and Ghanekar formed Smoke, a music production company that created music for commercials, TV serials and films. This creative partnership lead to composing the music for films like Tamanna (1998), Bombay Boys (1998), Snip! (2000), White Noise (2004), Broken Thread (2007), MP3: Mera Pehla Pehla Pyaar (2007), The Whisperers (2009) and HELP (2010). As a solo composer, Phatak has also created the background scores for films such as Fire in the Blood (2013) and Zubaan (2016). Fire in the Blood premiered at the Sundance Film Festival in 2013. Zubaan, which premiered at the Busan Film Festival in 2015, was released mid-2016. He recently completed music for Ashram, a film that is slated for a 2018 release.

Musician

Phatak has been a part of over 15 contemporary music albums. He and Ghanekar released the Smoke Signals (2008), an album that has been in the making for 8 years, and one that features the duo's hit songs from their films. 2008 also saw the release of Phatak's debut solo album Sigh of an Angel where he collaborated with Australian artist Aurora Jane, acclaimed jazz guitarist Sanjay Divecha, Ghanekar, drummer Lindsay D'mello and singers Vivienne Pocha and Carolisa Monteiro. Phatak handled keyboards, vocals and guitar responsibilities. This was followed by The Psychic Plumber and Other Lies (2011), a multimedia project between Phatak and popular contemporary artist Sarnath Banerjee. Inspired by the products and advertising of the 70s and 80s, this collaboration culminated in a combination of text and drawings, sound and music, to recreate life in pre-liberalisation India.

The Petri Dish Project, an ambient psychedelic rock album with an acoustic as well as an electronic vibe, saw Phatak regroup with Lindsay D'Mello, and collaborate with a host of other musicians such as Monica Dogra, Suman Sridhar, Anushka Manchanda, Saba Azad, and JD Thirumalai.

Entrepreneur:

In 2008, Phatak and Dhruv, along with fellow partners Simran Mulchandani, Srila Chatterjee and Mahesh Mathai launched blueFROG, a live music venue in Lower Parel, Mumbai. 

The brand also expanded to open branches in Pune and Bangalore. The Delhi outlet shut for a few months in 2012 before reopening in a new avatar. blueFROG Mumbai shut down in August 2016.

In 2013, Phatak, along with noted sound engineer Nitin Chandy and other partners from related fields, united to form The True School of Music. 

Phatak also teaches the Music in Advertising module to students doing the professional level course.

Phatak joined musician Ranjit Barot, businessman Nakul Toshniwal, and restaurateur Nico Goghavala to form The Quarter, within the newly restored Royal

Filmography

As composer:
Tamanna (1998)
Bombay Boys (1998)
Snip! (2000)
White Noise (2005)
Broken Thread (2007)
MP3: Mera Pehla Pehla Pyaar (2007)
HELP (2010)
Fire in the Blood (2013)

As sound editor:
In Theory (2012)

References

External links 

 

Indian male singer-songwriters
Indian singer-songwriters
Year of birth missing (living people)
Singers from Mumbai
Living people
Cathedral and John Connon School alumni
Businesspeople from Mumbai
Marathi-language singers
English-language singers from India
Marathi people
People from Maharashtra
Indian Hindus